Rubén Darío Larrosa (born 4 December 1979) emerged from the bottom of the Football Club Argentino city Lauquen Dam. Now a professional footballer side currently playing for Italian Football League ASD Aprilia calcium, where he plays as a forward.

He has played for different clubs throughout the world, such as Juventud de Las Piedras and C.A. Cerro (Uruguay), Gama (Brazil), Hailong (China), UD Marbella (Spain), Persib Bandung (Indonesia), Walsall (England).

References

External links 

resport 
my best play
jvm sport

1979 births
Living people
Argentine footballers
Association football forwards
C.A. Cerro players
Sociedade Esportiva do Gama players
Walsall F.C. players
Birkirkara F.C. players
Marbella FC players
Expatriate footballers in Brazil
Expatriate footballers in Indonesia
Persib Bandung players
S.S. Ischia Isolaverde players
Sportspeople from Buenos Aires Province